Robert Menzel from Silesia is a Polish footballer who last played as a defender for ÍA in the Icelandic Úrvalsdeild.

Club career
He made his professional debut on 29 April 2012 against Zagłębie Lubin.

References

External links
 
 

1991 births
Living people
Sportspeople from Wrocław
Polish footballers
Association football defenders
Ekstraklasa players
Úrvalsdeild karla (football) players
Śląsk Wrocław players
Jarota Jarocin players
Legionovia Legionowo players
Rozwój Katowice players
Podbeskidzie Bielsko-Biała players
Íþróttabandalag Akraness players
Polish expatriate footballers
Expatriate footballers in Iceland
Polish expatriate sportspeople in Iceland